Salesian College Celbridge is a secondary school catering for male students aged 12–19 around the County Kildare village of Celbridge in Ireland.

History
The Salesian College, Celbridge was originally formed in 1981 in a disused primary school on the Hazelhatch Road, which is now the Church of Ireland Primary School. Fr. Tony McEvoy SDB was the first principal with four staff members and fifty-five students. In the summer of  1984, the school moved to a newly-built premises, where it remains today. The new school and sports grounds are situated on fifteen acres, and there have been a number of developments and extensions since then. As of 2023, the school reportedly had over 700 students and 50 staff.

The school is no longer run by priests of the Salesian order. The principal is Brenda Kearns, who took up the position in August 2009 succeeding Fr. Dan Carroll.

Subjects
Salesians offers Junior Certificate, Transition Year, and Leaving Certificate courses, as well as a unit for autistic youths. The school's classes have been mixed since 2004.

In the Leaving Certificate cycle, courses in biology, chemistry, and physics are offered. The Junior-cycle subject broadly defined as "Business Studies" is devolved into separate courses accounting, business and economics. Students may also pursue courses in art, construction, technical drawing or engineering. The Leaving Certificate Vocational Programme, which aims to provide a more vocation-oriented education can also be taken by students of the College. The school also has IT facilities.

Sport
Sports played at Salesians include soccer, athletics, hurling, rugby, badminton and Gaelic football.
An annual road race, held each October, is a  road race participated in by around 450 students. The Fr. Archer Cup, named after the late Fr. Charles Archer, a former teacher, is awarded to the winner.

Salesians won the U14 All-Ireland Soccer Final in 2006. The Salesians' senior soccer team reached the Senior Soccer All-Ireland final in 2010, losing to St. Marys, Galway, in the last minute of extra time.
The Salesian Senior football team reached the All-Ireland "B" semi finally in 2010, losing to Éire Óg in Carlow by 2 points.
The U16 football team reached the Leinster "B" Final against Moath CBS, where they lost by 2 goals the same year.

Notable past pupils
 Damien Rice, singer and former member of the band Juniper.
 All four members of indie rock band Bell X1
 Members of "Juliets Rescue", formerly Box Social
 Devon Murray, actor  
 Karl Bermingham, striker for Derry City FC 
 Mark Kenneally, Olympic marathon runner
 Daniel O'Reilly, footballer

References

Celbridge
Boys' schools in the Republic of Ireland
Salesian secondary schools
Secondary schools in County Kildare
Catholic secondary schools in the Republic of Ireland
1981 establishments in Ireland
Educational institutions established in 1981